The Greatness of a Hero is a Hong Kong television historical drama serial produced by TVB under executive producer Leung Choi-yuen. It first aired on Malaysia's Astro On Demand from 9 February to 6 March 2009 and on several TVB overseas cable channels in 2010. The Greatness of a Hero started its broadcast on Hong Kong's Jade and HD Jade channels on 2 April 2012.

Synopsis
Dik Yan-kit was a legendary chancellor in China's history. He served as chancellor during the Tang dynasty and Zhou dynasty and was greatly trusted by Mo Chak-tin. The Empress's nephew, Mo Sing-chi, was jealous and sought every opportunity to frame him. He accused Dik of colluding with his son-in-law Sung Ting-yuk in order to usurp the Empress's throne. Dik's family was seized but in the confusion, Dik escaped. Mo Sing-chi then threatened to kill Dik's wife, Cho Yuet. Will Dik Yan-kit be able to win against his enemies?

Cast
 Note: Some of the characters' names are in Cantonese romanisation.

The Dik family

The Mo family

The Sung family

The Cho family

The royal court of the Zhou dynasty

Viewership ratings
The following is a table that includes a list of the total ratings points based on television viewership. "Viewers in millions" refers to the number of people, derived from TVB Jade ratings (not including TVB HD Jade), in Hong Kong who watched the episode live. The peak number of viewers are in brackets.

References

External links
Official website

TVB dramas
2009 Hong Kong television series debuts
2009 Hong Kong television series endings
2012 Hong Kong television series debuts
2012 Hong Kong television series endings
Television series set in the Tang dynasty
Hong Kong television shows
Period television series
Television series set in the Zhou dynasty (690–705)
Cultural depictions of Wu Zetian
Cultural depictions of Di Renjie
Television series set in the 7th century